Milika Limwanya (born 8 January 1996) is a Zambian footballer who plays as a defensive midfielder. She has been a member of the Zambia women's national team.

Club career
Having been a product of Chiparamba Youth Soccer Academy, Limwanya has played for ZESCO United FC.
She also played for Red Arrows women Football Team.
She's one of the prospectshaving been identified through the Airtel Rising Stars which also brought to light the likes of Patson Daka, Enoch Mwepu and others.

International career
Limwanya capped for Zambia at the 2017 COSAFA Women's Championship.

References

1996 births
Living people
Women's association football midfielders
Zambian women's footballers
Zambia women's international footballers
ZESCO United F.C. players